Islands Brygge (English: Iceland's Quay) is a harbourfront area in central Copenhagen, Denmark, located on the north-western coast of Amager. The neighbourhood is noted for its waterfront park Havneparken, which is one of the most popular  areas along the Copenhagen harbourfront and the location of one of the Copenhagen Harbour Baths.

Established through a series of land reclamations from the 1880s, it served both military, residential, industrial and dockland purposes. In the mid-20th century it developed an infamous reputation as a neglected industrial and dockland area, but since 2000 it has undergone massive redevelopment and has become a fashionable and attractive neighbourhood. It is characterized by a mixture of old buildings and modern architecture, with a number of old structures relating to the area's dockland past preserved and converted into new functions.

Geography
Islands Brygge has an area of roughly 1 km² and a population of 12,147 (2009),  though it has never been an administrative unit with formally defined boundaries. It can be thought of as bounded by the Stadsgraven moat to the north, Copenhagen Harbour to the west, the Nokken allotments to the south, Ørestad North to the north-east and Amager Common to the east. For some of its course, Artillerivej defines the eastern border, but towards the north Islands Brygge straddles the street; Islands Brygge Metro Station, the Serum Institute and Islandsbrygge School, all of which are normally considered Islands Brygge, are all located east of Artillerivej.

History
The north-western shore of Amager was originally characterized by a shallow watered beach. The northern part of this area was reclaimed already in the 1620s with the construction of Christianshavn and the fortification of Copenhagen, while the area which would later become Islands Brygge remained undeveloped until the 1880s. At that time the shoreline was situated just east of present-day Artillerivej. In the 1880s, Christian IV's Arsenal on Slotsholmen had become too small, and the military received permission to reclaim an area to the south-west of Slotsgraven for the purpose of new military facilities. The area was filled in 1887-88 and a new arsenal, shooting ranges and army barracks were constructed on the land.

Towards the end of the 19th century, the Port of Copenhagen had become very busy both with freight and passenger vessels and extensions were needed. In 1901, the Port Authorities extended the existing reclamation southwards to create new areas for the storage of coal, timber and other goods. From 1905 construction of residential buildings on the most inland parts of the new land began.

The co-operative Danish retailer FDB established new headquarters in the neighbourhood in 1908. It comprised both administrative functions, production and storage facilities.

Dansk Sojakagefabrik, a soy bean processing plant, was opened by the East Asiatic Company in 1909. At its peak in the 1950s, the plant employed approximately 2,500 workers, many of whom lived in the neighbourhood.

To improve road and rail connections between Zealand and Amager, a new bridge was constructed at the site of the present-day Langebro, replacing an older bridge leading to Christianshavn. The new bridge soon became outdated and in 1930 a new temporary bridge was built. Langebro was completed in 1954.

Still more land was reclaimed until 1933, when Islands Brygge reached its current extent.

Under the Occupation of Denmark during World War II, many German troops were stationed at Islands Brygge, and the area was the target of a number of sabotage acts by the Danish resistance movement. After World War II, the military presence in the area diminished and by 1976 most of the former military buildings had been demolished or converted to other use.

Industrial activities continued in the area, but as a number of companies closed their production plants, Islands Brygge became known as a neglected and rough working-class neighbourhood, dominated by abandoned industrial sites.

The first step towards the transformation of the area into a lively, fashionable neighbourhood was taken in 1984 with the establishment of Havneparken. During the 1990s, the area started to attract attention among real estate investors, and from 2000, as real estate prices rose dramatically, the area saw massive redevelopment with construction of numerous new office and residential buildings.

Islands Brygge today
Islands Brygge is today a fashionable mainly residential neighbourhood, stretching from Langebro in the north to Bryggebroen in the south. The northern part of the area, from Langebro to Sturlasgade, is dominated by early 20th-century residential blocks with small shops at street level.

 
The area from Sturlasgade to Bryggebroen, also known as Havnestaden, used to be an industrial site processing soy beans for animal feed, but is after redevelopment dominated by new office and residential buildings. Some structures from the area's industrial and dockland past have been preserved and converted to other uses. These include Gemini Residence, the Wennberg Silo and the Zepeline Building.

Havneparken (English: The Harbour Park), located directly on the waterfront, is the main recreational area of the neighbourhood and one of the most lively and popular  places along the Copenhagen harbourfront. It has retained several features from the area's industrial past, including old railway tracks and an old railway car. The park is also the location of the Islands Brygge Cultural House and the Islands Brygge Harbour Bath.

"Hotel Copenhagen" is located at Egilsgade. It is one of the few hotels located in the area. At the entrance to Islands Brygge is "Radisson Scandinavia", one of the tallest hotels in Copenhagen. The newest hotel at Islands Brygge is "Stay Copenhagen" on the street Islands Brygge

Famous people from Islands Brygge
Natasja Saad
Mikkel Kessler
Linse Kessler

Image gallery

See also
 Goboat

References

External links

 iNDUSTRIbRYGGE.dk Photographs from the time when Islands Brygge was an industrial area

Copenhagen city districts
Redeveloped ports and waterfronts in Denmark
Land reclamation in Copenhagen
Port of Copenhagen
Land reclamation in Denmark